Dragan Gošić (born 10 June 1981) is a Serbian former football player who played as a striker.

External links
 
 Profile at Footballdatabase

1981 births
Living people
Serbian footballers
Serbian expatriate footballers
FK BSK Borča players
FK Laktaši players
FCV Farul Constanța players
Expatriate footballers in Romania
Liga I players
Association football forwards